Jean-Claude Colotti (born 1 July 1961) is a French former professional road bicycle racer (from 1986 to 1996). Colotti won a stage in the 1992 Tour de France. He was part of a breakaway that finished about fifteen minutes ahead of the peloton. Colotti went on a solo attack and beat 2nd place finisher Frans Maassen by more than three minutes.

Major results

1987
 National Track Pursuit Championship
Tour de Vendée
1988
GP Saint-Etienne Loire
1989
GP Ouest-France
1991
Lisieux
Nantes
Six-Days of Grenoble (with Philippe Tarantini)
1992
Dijon
Hendaye
Tour de France:
Winner stage 17
1994
Six Days of Nouméa (with Jean-Michel Pontarlier)
Six-Days of Grenoble (with Dean Woods)
1996
Riom

References

External links 

1961 births
Living people
Sportspeople from La Tronche
French male cyclists
French Tour de France stage winners
Cyclists from Auvergne-Rhône-Alpes